Henry Cassidy Midgley, PC (NI), known as Harry Midgley (1893 – 29 April 1957) was a prominent trade-unionist and politician in Northern Ireland. Born to a working-class Protestant family in Tiger's Bay, north Belfast, he followed his father into the shipyard. After serving on the Western Front in the Great War, he became an official in a textile workers union and a leading light in the Belfast Labour Party (BLP). He represented the party's efforts in the early 1920s to provide a left opposition to the Unionist government of the new Northern Ireland while remaining non-committal on the divisive question of Irish partition.

From 1932 as secretary of the BLP's successor, the Northern Ireland Labour Party (NILP), he urged a closer relationship to British labour movement. Midgley's support for the Republic in the Spanish Civil War, and more broadly his criticism of Irish neutrality in the Second World War. antagonised Catholic voters and precipitated a split with party colleagues. At the end of 1942 Midgley formed the Commonwealth Labour Party and entered the Northern Ireland government first as Minister for Public Security and then as Minister for Labour. After the war, and as an Ulster Unionist, he served as Minister for Education overseeing the raising of the school leaving age to 15 and an expanded programme of school construction.

Early political education
Midgley was third child and eldest son among two daughters and three sons of Alexander Midgley (1860–99), shipyard labourer, originally of Lurgan, Co. Armagh, and Elizabeth Midgley (née Cassidy; c.1862–1929), also of Lurgan. He left school at age twelve, and worked two years as a grocer's helper before following his father (who died when Midgley was just six) into the Workman & Clark shipyard apprenticing as a joiner.

In 1912 Midgley emigrated to the USA where, working as a labourer, he joined the moderate American Federation of Labor. At home in Belfast on a visit at the outbreak of the First World War, Midgley enlisted and served in the 36th (Ulster) Division. Wounded and gassed, he believed that the revulsion throughout Europe to the horrors of the war would hasten the socialist revolution. He returned to Belfast in 1919 and got a job as an organiser with the Linenlappers’ and Warehouse Workers Union (a position he held until 1942).

Midgley had already entered socialist politics before the war. He attended the Socialist Sunday School of the Independent Labour Party (ILP), and in 1907, aged fourteen, he debuted as a speaker at ILP Sunday meetings at Belfast's Custom House steps. That same year he canvassed for William Walker in his third unsuccessful parliamentary campaign in North Belfast. He also had the opportunity to meet and listen to the ILP leader Keir Hardie. Hardie who had been election agent for Walker in 1905 and in 1907 had convened in Belfast the first conference of his new parliamentary-based Labour Party.

At the height of the Home Rule Crisis in 1913, Hardie's party, in deference to the Irish Labour Party, decided on a policy of not standing candidates in Ireland. In the debates between Walker and James Connelly in 1911-12, Midgley had supported Connolly's separatist socialist republicanism. But after the war, rather than accept the Irish Labour Party's alignment with Sinn Fein's policy of an Irish secession, Midgley sought an independent vehicle for his labour politics.

Midgley had served in the First World War, and reflected on his experience in a collection of poems, Thoughts from Flanders.

Belfast, and Northern Ireland, Labour parties
In 1919, Midgley joined the Belfast Labour Party, and in 1920 he was elected with eleven other party candidates to Belfast City Council. Midgley highlighted the plight of unemployed ex-servicemen, hailed the revolutionary workers’ uprisings in Russia and Germany, and urged municipalisation of distribution of essential commodities. At the same time, determined to avoid a partition that would sunder the labour movement in Ireland, Midgley and the BLP supported the policy that the new Sinn Féin majority in the south and west of Ireland had repudiated: all-Ireland home rule. When the expulsion of catholic workers from the shipyards by loyalist mobs was followed by similar attacks on leftist protestants in July 1920, Midgley was among the trade-union leaders targeted for abuse.

At the time of the 1921 Northern Ireland general election, the first ever election to Northern Ireland's embryonic parliament, the "principal anxiety" of the Unionist Prime Minister James Craig was that the appeal of the BLP to working class Loyalists would split the unionist vote. When Labour candidates booked the Ulster Hall for a final rally, it was disrupted by Loyalist shipyard workers, who then telegraphed Craig to inform him that they had "captured the Ulster Hall from Bolsheviks [James] Baird, Midgley and [John] Hanna". Craig responded: "...Well done big and wee yards". Midgley lost his bid to take the Belfast East seat.

In the 1923 UK general election, in Belfast West Midgley again lost to the Ulster Unionist, albeit narrowly with 47% of the vote. His vote dropped to 40% in the 1924 UK general election as he tried to  bridge the constituency's unionist-nationalist divide. In the constituency's Protestant ward of Shankhill Midgley emphasised his loyal wartime military service, while in the Catholic Falls area he attacked the policy of internment directed at Irish republicans. In 1925 he was returned to the Belfast City Council for Dock Ward on a platform that called for new housing and rent restrictions, and for free education. Midgley held his council seat until 1943, becoming an Alderman in 1929.

In the 1933 Northern Ireland general election, Midgley was elected for Belfast Dock, now representing the Northern Ireland Labour Party (NILP) formed by  the BLP following the 1924 UK election. After taking his seat in the Stormont Parliament he was elected party secretary.

During the Spanish Civil War in the late 1930s, Midgley was outspoken in his support for the beleaguered Spanish Republic and described Franco as a "monstrosity" and a "killer of babies". In turn, Midgley became involved in a public controversy regarding The Irish News attitude to the Spanish Civil War. The newspaper supported Francisco Franco's Nationalists, partly because of Spanish Republican anti-clericalism, while Midgley saw the Spanish Republican side as fighting a war against fascism and in defence of democracy.

Contesting the Dock constituency in the 1938 Northern Ireland election Midgley saw nationalist protest against his support for the Spanish Republic reduce his vote share to 24%.  Night after night during the campaign there had been were violent clashes as Midgley faced hostile crowds shouting 'Up Franco', 'Remember Spain', and 'We want Franco'".

At the outbreak of war in 1939, as Midgley called for an all out effort to defeat Nazism. He not only antagonised the republican/nationalist wing of the party who, with communist left, characterised the conflict as a conflagration between rival imperialisms. He also alarmed pro-war colleagues unwilling to join Unionists in waving the Union Jack.

Commonwealth Labour Party
In 1941 Midgley made "a full blooded labour-unionist appeal" in a by-election for the Belfast Willowfield constituency. His victory in this strongly loyalist seat left J. M. Andrews, then Prime Minister of Northern Ireland, severely shaken. The Prime Minister later confided to Wilfrid Spender that "if there was a general election now the government would cease to have a majority".

At the NILP annual conference in October 1942, Midgley used his address as chairman to assert that the NILP "is proud to associate with the labour movements of the British Commonwealth and, indeed, the United Nations, in their resolve to free the world from the barbarities, bestialities and injustices of Nazi-Fascist totalitarianism". He went to suggest that among those who continue to subscribe to "outworn nationalism" there were "quislings, if not actual agents of Nazism". The British Cammonwealth", he added, "built up the finest system of social services in the world" (Midgley touted the social security system of New Zealand as second to none).

Jack Beattie (who been campaigning against the extension of conscription to Northern Ireland) disassociated himself from Midgley's views on the floor of the Northern Ireland House of Commons. When in December, the parliamentary NILP chose Beattie as their leader over Midgley, Midgley resigned the party whip, a departure followed by two party branches, Derry and North Belfast.

Midgley was later to attack Beattie in the Northern Ireland House of Commons. On 30 October 1945, he was excluded from the sitting for punching Beattie in what appeared to be a dispute over parliamentary procedure.

Midgley formed the Commonwealth Labour Party. In policy statement issued by the new party in January 1943, the CWLR committed itself to the consolidation of Northern Ireland within the United Kingdom and the British Commonwealth, and to the attainment of a system of social security and justice at par with the Labour's programme for Great Britain. The CWLR also adopted Clause Four of the British party's 1918 constitution: Efforts to secure endorsements from British Labour leaders, however, came to nothing.

Although widely known as "Midgley party", the CWLP did build a number of constituency branches and at its height in 1943/44 might have had a membership of 800 to 1000. It represented a sufficiently significant development that when in May 1943, Basil Brooke wished to broaden the base of government and distinguish himself from the leadership of Andrews, discredited in the wake of the Belfast Blitz, he appointed Midgley as Minister of Public Security. Midgley also became a member of the Privy Council of Northern Ireland. While this was shock to many Unionists, Brooke was satisfied that on the Union and support for the war effort, Midgley was sound. The CLP committed itself to collaboration with the Government for the duration of the war. The first non-UUP Stormont minister, Midgley, who could present himself as one of the many thousands in Belfast who had lost their home to German bombs, tirelessly toured Northern Ireland working to maintain civilian morale and civil defence readiness.

In a cabinet reshuffle in June 1944, Midgley became Minister of Labour. Concerned that immigrants from the south would "gravitate to the disloyal element in our population", he enacted a policy of granting the necessary residence permits only when warranted by the labour situation.

In the 1945 Northern Ireland general election, Midgley was the Commonwealth Labour Party's only successful candidate. In the UK general election later that year, he was held at 30% of the vote in Belfast South by a hardening Ulster Unionist opposition. Brooke did not reappoint Midgley. The CWLP, he suggested, was the thin edge of the wedge leading to "the broad edge of communism". The unionists believed they had reason for alarm: in the Stormont election, the CLPs six candidates, contributed 28,079 votes to a total combined vote of the various left-wing political parties of 125,869, compared to a unionist total of 178,662.

Ulster Unionist
The only other electoral foray undertaken by the CLP was in the local elections of 1946, which saw it win several council seats, although only one—Midgley's—in Belfast. Midgley appealed to his Protestant working-class base by calling for a withdrawal of state support for Catholic schools on the "socialist" principle that child education should comprehensive and nondenominational. But at the same time, Midgley was producing statements critical of "state control for the sake of state control" and of "frivolous" strikes, and proposing that "modern conservatism" might be viewed as a dynamic force.

At the end of World War II, the Unionist Government under Basil Brooke (Lord Brookeborough) accepted an offer from London—understood as a reward for the province's wartime service—to match the parity in taxation between Northern Ireland and Great Britain with parity in the services delivered. Once the government began to deliver social policy under the terms of this arrangement, Midgley was professed himself reconciled.

In September 1947 Midgley resigned as chairman of the Commonwealth Labour Party and, followed by some, but not all members, joined the Ulster Unionists. He took the further step, de rigueur for Unionist ministers, of joining the Orange Order. In the election of 1949 Midgley was once again re-elected for the Willowfield Constituency. By doing so he performed a unique feat: he had been returned for the same constituency under three different party labels: Labour, Commonwealth Labour and Ulster Unionist. His success was rewarded by his appointment first as Minister of Labour and then in 1950 (to the dismay of department civil servants) he replaced the liberal Unionist, Colonel Hall Thompson, as Minister of Education.

After 1953, Midgley intensified the construction of new school buildings mandated by the 1947 Education Act, and in 1957 he raised the school leaving age to 15. As minister he also oversaw improvements in teacher training, provision of state scholarships, and education for disabled students.

As minister Midgley contended that thousands of Catholic parents would have liked to send their children to schools with children of other faiths, but that the “dictates of the Hierarchy of their Church” prevented the opportunity this presented for reconciliation.

Midgley's outspoken Unionism did not diminish over the years. In Portadown, in 1957, he said, "All the minority are traitors and have always been traitors to the government of Northern Ireland". Midgley died, while still in office, later that year.

While on military leave in Belfast in August 1918, Midgley had married Eleanor Adgey, also of north Belfast. They had two sons and two daughters.

 Linfield Club 

Harry Midgley was involved in the management of Linfield Football Club and the reserve pitch beside Windsor Park, is named Midgley Park' in his honour.

References 

1893 births
1957 deaths
Irish Protestants
Leaders of political parties in Northern Ireland
Members of the House of Commons of Northern Ireland 1933–1938
Members of the House of Commons of Northern Ireland 1938–1945
Members of the House of Commons of Northern Ireland 1945–1949
Members of the House of Commons of Northern Ireland 1949–1953
Members of the House of Commons of Northern Ireland 1953–1958
Members of the Privy Council of Northern Ireland
Northern Ireland Cabinet ministers (Parliament of Northern Ireland)
Northern Ireland Labour Party members of the House of Commons of Northern Ireland
Ulster Unionist Party members of the House of Commons of Northern Ireland
Members of the House of Commons of Northern Ireland for Belfast constituencies
Commonwealth Labour Party members of the House of Commons of Northern Ireland